The 1991 IBF World Championships (World Badminton Championships) were held in Copenhagen, Denmark in 1991. Following the results of the men's doubles.

Qualification 
 Hannes Fuchs / Heimo Götschl -  Tariq Farooq /  Graham Henderson: 15–7, 15-3 
 Ricky Subagja / Rexy Mainaky -  Piotr Mazur / Dariusz Zieba: 15–1, 15-1 
 Ri Nam Chol / Ri Yong Hwan -  Beelall Bhurtun / James Moon Lin Lan:  w.o.
 Pavlos Charalambidis /  Kevin Scott -  Remy Matthey de L'Etang / Thomas Wapp: 5-15, 15–12, 15-8
 Stefaan Cognie / Yves de Negri -  Danjuma Fatauchi /  Segun Odusola: w.o.
 Mika Heinonen / Tony Tuominen -  Ivan Dobrev Ivanov / Boris Lalov: 15–6, 15-2
 Ernesto de la Torre / Fernando de la Torre - Prakash Doj Rana / Ramjee B. Shrestha: w.o.
 Borge Larsen / Oystein Larsen -  Grzegorz Piotrowski / Damian Plawecki: 9-15, 15–7, 15-10
 Peter Blackburn / Darren McDonald -  Ng Pak Kum / Tse Bun: 15–5, 15-10
 Nick Ponting / Dave Wright -  Gudmundur Adolfsson /  John Britton: w.o.
 Vacharapan Khamthong / Sompol Kukasemkij -  Pjuzant Kassabian /  Nicolas Pissis: 15–8, 15-1
 Fumihiko Machida / Koji Miya -  Arni Thor Hallgrimsson / Broddi Kristjansson: 15–9, 15-12 
 Gilles Allet / Eddy Clarisse -  Kenneth Erichsen /  Edwin van Dalm: w.o.
 Russell Hogg / Kenny Middlemiss -  Hubert Müller / Christian Nyffenegger: 15–2, 15-9
 Markus Keck / Stephan Kuhl -  Horng Shin-Jeng / Lee Mou-Chou: 15–9, 15-12 
 David Humble / Anil Kaul -  Christophe Jeanjean / Etienne Thobois: 15–10, 15-5

Main stage

Section 1

Section 2

Section 3

Section 4

Final stage

References
http://www.tournamentsoftware.com/sport/events.aspx?id=D35444A5-8F1F-4B92-8ACA-39FE076F5602

1991 IBF World Championships